Ian Colin Taylor MBE (born 18 April 1945) is a British former Conservative Party politician who was the Member of Parliament (MP) for Esher from 1987 to 1997, and then for Esher and Walton from 1997 to 2010.

Early life
He went to Whitley Abbey School, Abbey Road, Coventry. He studied at Keele University, receiving a BA (Hons) in Economics, Politics and Modern History in 1967. He then did research at the London School of Economics. In 1969, he joined Hill Samuel & Co. In 1971, he became the manager of the European Department at Stirling & Co. From 1975 to 1978, he lived in Paris. He worked as a Director for Mathercourt Securities Ltd from 1980 to 1991. He is an Associate of the UK Society of Investment Professionals and a Liveryman of the Worshipful Company of Information Technologists.

Political career
Before being elected for Esher in 1987, Taylor had fought Coventry South East in February 1974, being beaten by Labour's Bill Wilson.

In the period in which he served Esher, the make-up of the seat was classified by economists as a 'natural home' for Taylor's party, and by historians as a safe seat, including its main successor, which he served from 1997 to 2010. Esher is part of the London Commuter Belt, and has seen strong Conservative majorities since the 1930s; Taylor won five elections before deciding to stand down at the 2010 general election to resume a business career.

He was during his first two terms appointed Parliamentary Private Secretary (PPS) at the Foreign Office, Department of Health and Cabinet Office.  He served as Minister for Science and Technology for most of the Second Major ministry: from 1994 to 1997. He became a Shadow Minister for Northern Ireland in 1997, tracking the peace process.

He supported bids for leadership and main policies of Kenneth Clarke except in the 2005 Conservative leadership contest when he backed David Davis.

Taylor was the Chairman of the European Movement (2000–2005) and a member of the Britain in Europe Council until 2005. He chaired the  Conservative Group for Europe 2007–11. His views became increasingly challenged by the Conservative Party. In December 2000 he comfortably overcame an attempted de-selection campaign by eurosceptics in his constituency.

He specialised in science and technology issues. He was Minister for Science, Technology and Space at the DTI during 1994–1997 in a Conservative Government. During this time he dealt with a wide variety of issues, including providing support for the next phase of the Large Hadron Collider at CERN, increasing awareness of the importance of access to the early internet revolution and coordinating Government support for the Roslin Institute which led to the Cloning of Dolly the Sheep and the creation of the Human Genetics Advisory Commission] in February 1997.

In 2003, he was one of only 15 Conservative MPs who voted against the Iraq War.

He was Chairman of the Conservative Policy Task-force on Science, Technology, Engineering and Mathematics 2005–2009. He chaired the all-Party Parliamentary and Scientific Committee (the oldest all-party committee), which includes the Parliamentary Engineering Group. He was also an officer of several all-party Parliamentary committees, including the Office of Science & Technology, the Information Society Alliance (EURIM), PITCOM (Information Technology Committee) and the Corporate Social Responsibility Group.   For his comments on science roles, see https://portlandpress.com/biochemist/article/44/1/2/230733/Government-science-ambitions-require-greater 

He was a member of the Commission on National Security 2007–09. He was a Visiting Parliamentary Fellow at St. Antony's College Oxford in the Hilary Term 2007, lecturing on energy security.  He chaired the European Movement 2000–05 and the Conservative Europe Group 2007-11 and also in 1985–88.  He also chaired the Cuba Initiative 2006–2011.

From 1997 until 2010, he was a non-executive director of or adviser to various companies, according to the Register of Members Interests. In 2008, Taylor gained the (Sir) Arthur C. Clarke Award for Individual Achievement in Promoting Space and Science. He was co-chair of the Parliamentary Space Committee and in 2009 he chaired the European Inter-Parliamentary Space Conference.

After Parliament
Taylor has become chairman of two companies, on the board or advisory board of others. He was on the Government's Science & Technology Facilities Council 2011–2018, on an ESA (European Space Agency) Advisory Board, chaired the National Space Academy steering group until 2018 and was Chair and now President of The League of Remembrance.

During the 2019 general election campaign, he declared that he had become an Independent Conservative and explained in an open letter why on balance he supported the Liberal Democrat candidate in Esher and Walton.

Personal life
Taylor married Carole Alport in 1974 (daughter of late Lord Alport), and they have two sons.

References

External links 
 Ian Taylor MBE MP official site.   Now see www.ian-taylor.eu 
 
 ePolitix.com - Ian Taylor MP
 Guardian Unlimited Politics - Ask Aristotle: Ian Taylor MP
 TheyWorkForYou.com - Ian Taylor MP
 The Public Whip - Ian Taylor MP voting record]
 BBC News - Ian Taylor MP profile 15 February 2005]
 Dominic Raab’s Tory predecessor urges voters to back Lib Dems as he blasts Boris Johnson’s Brexit plans
 

Alumni of Keele University
Alumni of the London School of Economics
Conservative Party (UK) MPs for English constituencies
Members of the Order of the British Empire
UK MPs 1987–1992
UK MPs 1992–1997
UK MPs 1997–2001
UK MPs 2001–2005
UK MPs 2005–2010
1945 births
Living people